Somewhere in Time may refer to:

 Somewhere in Time (film), a 1980 time travel romance
 Somewhere in Time (Iron Maiden album), 1986
 Somewhere in Time, a 2002 album by Donny Osmond
 Somewhere in Time (Reckless Kelly album), 2010
Bid Time Return, a 1975 science fiction novel by Richard Matheson, which in later editions was retitled Somewhere in Time